Sutton Coldfield Hockey Club is a field hockey club based at Rectory Park in Sutton Coldfield, West Midlands.

The club runs eight men's, seven women's teams in addition to mixed, veterans and junior teams. The women's first XI play in the Investec Women's Hockey League Conference North   and the men's first XI play in the Midlands 1 Division.

The women's team has gained significant honours -

Major honours

National honours
 1980-81 Cup Champions
 1988-89 Cup Runner-Up
 1989-90 Cup Champions
 1990-91 Cup Champions
 1999-2000 Cup Runner-Up

European honours
 1992 European Cup Winners Cup winners

Notable players

Women's internationals

References

External links

English field hockey clubs